This is a list of Australian soccer transfers for the 2020–21 W-League. Only moves featuring at least one W-League club are listed.

Transfers
All players without a flag are Australian. Clubs without a flag are clubs participating in the W-League.

Pre-season

Mid-season

Re-signings

Notes

References

A-League Women transfers
Football transfers summer 2020
Football transfers winter 2020–21
transfers
transfers
A-League Women lists